Justus Falckner (November 22, 1672 – September 21, 1723) was an early American Lutheran minister and the first Lutheran pastor to be ordained within the region that became the United States. Falckner's published works include Grondlycke Onderricht, which first appeared in the Dutch language during 1708. This was the first Lutheran catechism to be published in North America. He is commemorated in the Calendar of Saints of the Lutheran Church on November 24 together with Jehu Jones and William Passavant.

Background
Falckner was the fourth son of Daniel Falckner, a Lutheran pastor at Langenreinsdorf, a subdivision of Crimmitschau in Saxony. In 1693, he entered the University of Halle, where he studied theology under August Hermann Francke. He completed his studies, but determined that he was not truly prepared to follow a career in the ministry. He went to Rotterdam, where he and his brother Daniel accepted power of attorney to sell the land of William Penn in Pennsylvania.

Career
In 1701, 10,000 acres (40 km2) of land along the Manatawny Creek were sold to Swedish Lutheran Pastor Andreas Rudman and other Swedish settlers. After working with Pastor Rudman, Falckner reconsidered entering the ministry. He was ordained on November 24, 1703, at Gloria Dei Church, the Swedish Lutheran Church in Wicaco, today South Philadelphia. His first pastoral assignment was with the settlers on the Manatawny Creek in New Hanover Township, Pennsylvania.

On February 23, 1704, King Carl XII of Sweden issued an order formally confirming Rudman as Superintendent of the Swedish Lutheran Church in America. Shortly thereafter, Falckner was reassigned by Rudman to serve as the pastor of the Dutch Lutheran congregations in Manhattan and Albany County, New York and Hackensack, New Jersey. He learned the Dutch language and also preached in English and later in German after he succeeded Joshua Kocherthal in the ministry of German Lutheran immigrants. In 1714, Falckner led worshippers at the founding of Zion Evangelical Lutheran Church in Oldwick, New Jersey's oldest Lutheran congregation. In time he was serving fourteen congregations in the Hudson River valley.

Falckner evidently believed that music was a very important element of missionary work. He wrote to Germany to ask for an organ, which he said would attract more Native American converts. Falckner wrote hymns such as "Rise, Ye Children of Salvation" (German: Auf! ihr Christen, Christi Glieder), which he composed while a student at the University of Halle in 1697.

Personal life
Justus Falckner was married to Gerritje Hardick in 1717. Three children were born to the couple: Anna Catharina (1718), Sara Justa (1720), and Benedictus (1723). Justus Falckner died during 1723 in Orange County, New York.

References

Other sources
Sachse, Julius Friedrich (1903) Justis Falckner, Mystic and Scholar, Devout Pietist in Germany (Lancaster, PA: The New Era Printing Company)

Related reading
Williams, Kim-Eric (2003) The Journey of Justus Falckner. 1672-1723. (Delhi, New York: American Lutheran Publicity Bureau) 
Kessler, Martin (2003) Fundamental Instruction: Justus Falckner's Catechism. The First Lutheran Catechism Written and Published in North America A. D. 1708 (Delih, NY: American Lutheran Publicity Bureau)

External links
Gloria Dei (Old Swedes') Church

Entry for Justus Falckner in the Christian Cyclopedia
Justus Falckner's Catechism

1672 births
1723 deaths
People from Crimmitschau
People from the Electorate of Saxony
18th-century Lutheran clergy
People celebrated in the Lutheran liturgical calendar
18th-century American Lutheran clergy
People of colonial Pennsylvania
People of colonial New Jersey
Martin Luther University of Halle-Wittenberg alumni
German emigrants to the Thirteen Colonies
17th-century Lutheran theologians
18th-century Lutheran theologians